Andy Warhol's Cow Wallpaper was the first in a series of wallpaper designs he created from the 1960s to the 1980s.

According to Warhol, the inspiration for the cow image came from art dealer Ivan Karp:
Another time he said, "Why don't you paint some cows, they're so wonderfully pastoral and such a durable image in the history of the arts." (Ivan talked like this.) I don't know how "pastoral" he expected me to make them, but when he saw the huge cow heads — bright pink on a bright yellow background — that I was going to have made into rolls of wallpaper, he was shocked. But after a moment he exploded with: "They're super-pastoral! They're ridiculous! They're blazingly bright and vulgar!" I mean, he loved those cows and for my next show we papered all the walls in the gallery with them.

The show Warhol refers to is his April 1966 show at the Leo Castelli Gallery, which consisted only of Cow Wallpaper in one room, and a second room with Warhol's silver helium-filled Clouds.

The historian and critic Barbara Rose interpreted Cow Wallpaper as a commentary on the nature of art collecting and the character of the institutions where art is displayed. In a review of Warhol's 1971 retrospective show at the Whitney, she observed that cows are a common subject of genre paintings that people display in their homes, and that the wallpaper made the Whitney look like "a boutique". She continued: "Of course the museum has been a boutique for a long time, and people have been treating paintings like wallpaper even longer. But Andy spells it out with his usual cruel clarity."

References

External links
Pictures of 1966 show at Leo Castelli Gallery
Picture of 1971 show at Whitney
Version of Cow Wallpaper exhibited at the Whitney, in the collection of the Metropolitan Museum of Art

Art by Andy Warhol
Cattle in art
American art